Eveline Mabel Richardson Burns (March 16, 1900 – September 2, 1985) was a British-American economist, writer and instructor.

Born Eveline Mabel Richardson in London, England, she was the only child of Eveline Maud Falkner and Frederick Haig Richardson. Her mother died following her birth, so her father remarried and had three more children. Eveline attended Seatham Secondary School, then entered the London School of Economics at age 16 and graduated in 1920, earning a B.S. with first class honors. In 1922 she married the economist Arthur Robert Burns and the couple emigrated to the United States. After the award of her Ph.D. in 1926, she gained a Laura Spelman Rockefeller Fellowship. She and her husband traveled the country for two years while writing The Economic World.

She became professor of Social Work at Columbia University in 1928. In 1933, during the Great Depression, she returned to England in 1933 to study unemployment programs. In 1934, as a member of President Franklin D. Roosevelt's Committee on Economic Security, she helped design the US Social Security Act of 1935. During the following years she served with the American Association for Social Security, the Social Welfare Committee of the YWCA and the Executive Board of the Women's Club of New York. From 1939–1943 she was head of the economic security and health section of the National Resources Planning Board. In the 1940s, she was the Anna Shaw Lecturer at Bryn Mawr College and a professor at Columbia.

From 1953–1954 she was vice-president and president of the American Economic Association. In 1954 she was awarded the Adam Smith Medal for outstanding economic research. The same year she received a Guggenheim Fellowship. Between 1950–1958, she held various posts in the National Conference on Social Welfare. In 1968 she was given the Blanche Ittelson Award.

During her career she published multiple works on social welfare. She died at St. Mary's Hospital in Newton, Pennsylvania. Arthur and Eveline did not have any children.

Bibliography

The American Social Security System, 1949
 Private and social insurance and the problem of social security, Canadian Welfare Association, 1953.
 Social Security and Public Policy, 1956.
 Toward Social Security: An Explanation of the Social Security Act and a Survey of the Larger Issues, 1936
 Wages and the state: a comparative study of the problems of state wage regulation, P. S. King, 1926.

References

External links

 Security, Work, and Relief Policies, 1942
 Finding aid for the Eveline Burns papers at the Social Welfare History Archives, University of Minnesota Libraries.
Finding aid to the Eveline Mabel Richardson Burns papers at Columbia University. Rare Book & Manuscript Library

1900 births
1985 deaths
Alumni of the London School of Economics
Columbia University faculty
American women economists
20th-century American economists
20th-century American women scientists
20th-century American scientists
British emigrants to the United States